Giorgos Zographos (Greek: , ; born 4 August 1936; body discovered 12 August 2005) was a Greek musician and actor.

Biography
Georgios Zographos was born in Athens in 1936, the son of actors  Nikos Zographos and Alikē Zographou. He started his career as an actor after graduating from the Drama School of Karolos Koun. He first sang in the Mykonos boîte Thalamē followed by appearances at many musical clubs at Plaka.

Zographos was a representative of the Greek New Wave. Some of his most famous song performances are that  (written by Notis Mavroudes),  (by Giannis Markopoulos),  (by Nikos Mamangakis),  (by Mikis Theodorakis),  (by Manos Hatzidakis).

Death
In Friday, 12 August 2005, Zographos was found dead in his flat in Syntagma Square. He was found by one of his  friends who had been worried about Zographos been missing for about 15 days. Zographos was buried on 17 August, and interred in Athens' Kaisarianē Cemetery. Zographos was survived by his daughter.

Noted performances and discography
The following is a list of the noted discography and live performances of Zographos, including third party albums and collections:
1965 - Thessaloniki Song Festival
1965 - 
1967 - 
1968 - 
1968 - 
1969 - 
1969 - 
1970 - 
1972 - 
1974 - 
1975 - 
1976 - 
1976 - 
1978 - 
1978 - 
1979 - 
1981 - 
1983 - 
1984 - 
1987 - 
1990 - 
1993 - 
1993 - 
1994 - 
1995 -

References

1936 births
2005 deaths
20th-century Greek male singers
Musicians from Athens
Male actors from Athens